Rhodopagus is an extinct genus of perissodactyl mammal from family Hyracodontidae, that lived in central Asia.

Age: Eocene, 45 million years ago.

Size: as big as a cat.

References

Eocene odd-toed ungulates
Eocene mammals of Asia
Hyracodonts